Zhansaya Koziyeva (born 28 December 1996) is a Kazakhstani footballer who plays as a defender for FC Okzhetpes and the Kazakhstan women's national team.

Club career
Koziyeva has played for Okzhetpes in Kazakhstan.

International career
Koziyeva made her senior debut for Kazakhstan on 12 June 2021 in a 1–2 friendly away loss to Armenia.

References

External links

1996 births
Living people
Kazakhstani women's footballers
Women's association football defenders
Kazakhstan women's international footballers